Dioscorea orangeana, is a tuberous vining flowering plant in the genus Dioscorea, endemic the Forêt d’Orangea near Antsiranana in Madagascar, from which it derives its name.  The tuber is possibly edible, and unlike most other Dioscorea species, the tuber has many finger-like lobes as opposed to a single tuber.  Because the plant is new to science and the possible harvesting by local populations, the conservation status of Dioscorea orangeana is of great concern.

Taxonomy 
Dioscorea orangeana belongs to the genus Dioscorea referring to the plants producing edible roots known as yams.

References

External links
 Dioscorea orangeana information and photograph from Kew

orangeana
Endemic flora of Madagascar
Plants described in 2009